Qaidi is a 1986 Pakistani Punjabi language action film and musical film. It was directed by Masood Butt and produced by Mian Farzand Ali.

Cast
 Sultan Rahi
 Anjuman
 Afzaal Ahmad
 Zamurrad
 Mustafa Qureshi
 Shugafta
 Firdous Begum
 Nanha
 Ilyas Kashmiri
 Rangeela
 Altaf Khan
 Zahir Shah
 Jaggi Malik
 Asif Khan

Crew
Writer - Nasir Adeeb
Producer - Mian Farzand Ali 
Production Company - Arain Pictures
Cinematographer - Masud Butt
Music Director - Nazir Ali
Lyricist - Waris Ludhianvi
Playback Singers - Noor Jehan

Soundtrack
The music of the film is by musician Nazir Ali. The lyrics are penned by Khawaja Pervaiz and singers Noor Jehan and Nazir Ali.

References

External links
 

Pakistani action films
1986 films
Punjabi-language Pakistani films
1980s Punjabi-language films